Eduardo Manzano II (born July 18, 1938) is a Mexican comedian, singer, and actor. He is most recognized as one of the "Polivoces" and for his role in Una familia de diez (2007–present). He is an actor from Golden Age of Mexican cinema.

Selected filmography
 One for the Road (2015)
 Marcianos vs. Mexicanos (2018) (voice)

References

External links

1938 births
Living people
Male actors from Mexico City
Mexican male comedians
Mexican male film actors
Mexican male television actors